A Sword for Brando (Italian: Una spada per Brando) is a 1970 Italian adventure film directed by Alfio Caltabiano and starring Riccardo Salvino, Karin Schubert and Tano Cimarosa.

Cast
 Riccardo Salvino as Robin Hood  
 Karin Schubert as Samanta  
 Tano Cimarosa as Greedy friar  
 Furio Meniconi as Tall friar  
 Gérard Herter 
 Sandro Dori as Fra' Gisippo  
 Richard Watson
 Gianna Zingone 
 Dante Maggio 
 Consalvo Dell'Arti 
 Paolo Magalotti 
 Giorgio Dolfin 
 Alfio Caltabiano as The Count  
 Ivano Staccioli

References

Bibliography 
 Roberto Curti. Italian Crime Filmography, 1968-1980. McFarland, 2013.

External links 
 

1970s historical adventure films
Italian historical adventure films
1970 films
1970s Italian-language films
Films directed by Alfio Caltabiano
Films scored by Carlo Rustichelli
Films set in the Middle Ages
1970s Italian films